Lang is a surname of Germanic origin, closely related to Lange, Laing and Long, all of which mean "tall".

"Lang" (Láng) is also a surname in Hungary, a cognate of the Hungarian word for "flame."

Surname

Australian
Gary Lang, choreographer and dancer, director of NT Dance Company
Jack Lang (1876–1975), politician
Jeff Lang (born 1969), songwriter, singer and slide guitarist
John Lang (1816–1864), was said to be the first Australian-born novelist
John Lang (born 1950), coach and former player of rugby league in Australia
John Dunmore Lang (1799–1878), publicist and politician
Martin Lang (rugby league), Australian rugby league player

European 
 Ádám Lang (born 1993), Hungarian footballer
 Adolf Lang (1848–1913), Hungarian-German architect
 Andrew Lang (1844–1912), Scottish philologist and translator of folk and fairy tales
 Anton Lang (1875–1938), German potter and actor
 Archibald Lang (fl. 1880), Scottish international football player
 Arnold Lang (1855-1914), Swiss naturalist
 Belinda Lang (born 1955), English actress
 Bernhard Lang (born 1957), Austrian composer
 Cosmo Lang (1864–1945), Archbishop of Canterbury
 Craig Sellar Lang (1891–1971), British-domiciled organist, music teacher, and composer
 Czesław Lang (born 1955), Polish road racing cyclist and Tour de Pologne director
 David Marshall Lang (1924–1991), British historian
 Don Lang (musician) (1925–1992), English singer
 Eva Lang (born 1947), German economist
 Fritz Lang (1890–1976), Austrian film director
 Gerhard Lang (1924-2016), German botanist
 Harold Lang (1923-1970), British actor
 Hedi Lang (1931–2004), Swiss politician
 Hermann Lang (1909–1987), German race car driver
 Ian Lang (born 1940), Scottish politician
 István Láng, (born 1933), Hungarian composer
 Ivana Lang (1912–1982), Croatian composer, pianist and piano teacher
 Jack Lang (born 1939), French politician
 Josephine Lang (1815–1880), German composer
 Júlia Láng (born 2003), Hungarian figure skater
 Julia Lang (actress) (born 1921), British actress and radio presenter
 Karel Lang, Czech ice hockey player
 Karl Georg Herman Lang (1901–1976), Swedish naturalist
 Karl Nikolaus Lang (1670–1741), Swiss physician and naturalist
 Kirsty Lang (born 1962), British broadcaster and journalist
 Klaus Lang (born 1971), Austrian composer
 Leonora Blanche Lang (1851–1933), English author, editor, and translator
 Maria Lang, the pen name for Swedish crime novel writer Dagmar Lange (1914–1991) 
 Noa Lang, Dutch soccer player
 Peter Lang, Swiss publisher; see Peter Lang (publishing company)
 Prof Peter Redford Scott Lang FRSE (1850–1926) Scottish mathematician
 Rein Lang (born 1957), Estonian politician
Ricarda Lang (born 1994), German politician
 Rikard Lang (1913–1994), Croatian university professor, lawyer and economist
 Robert Lang (actor) (1934–2004), English actor
 Robert Lang (ice hockey) (born 1970), professional ice hockey player
 Sebastian Lang (born 1979), German professional road cyclist
 Serge Lang (1927–2005), mathematician and activist
 Serge Lang (skiing) (1920–1999), French journalist who founded the alpine skiing World Cup
 Slobodan Lang (1945–2016), Croatian physician and politician 
 Steven Lang (footballer) (born 1987), Swiss football midfielder
 Thomas Lang (born 1969), musician and drummer 
 Thomas Lang (singer), English singer and songwriter
 Valérie Lang (1966–2013), French actress
 Werner Lang (1922–2013), German engineer
 Zsolt Láng (born 1973), Hungarian politician

North American
Amanda Lang (born 1970), Canadian journalist
Andrew Lang, (born 1966), American basketball player
Annie Traquair Lang (1885–1918), American impressionist painter
Anton Lang (1913–1996), American natural scientist
Archie Lang, Canadian politician
Ben Lang (1870–1960), American politician
David Lang (1838–1917), Confederate States Army officer during the American Civil War
David Lang (born 1957), American composer, Pulitzer Prize winner
David Lang (1967–2005), football running back in the National Football League
D.L. Lang (born 1983), American poet
Eddie Lang (1902–1933), American jazz guitarist
Eric M. Lang, Canadian game designer
Eugene Lang (1919–2017), American businessman and philanthropist  
Glen Lang, American businessman and politician
Harold Lang (1920–1985), American ballet dancer
Harry E. Lang (1894–1953), American actor
John Lang (1839–1921), political figure and farmer in Ontario
John Lang (1794–?), United States Navy sailor
John H. Lang (1899–1970), United States Navy officer
Jonny Lang (born 1981), American blues guitarist
Kara Lang (born 1986), Canadian female soccer player
Katherine Kelly Lang (born 1961), American actress
k.d. lang (born 1961), Canadian singer-songwriter
Kris Lang (born 1979), American basketball player
Lex Lang (born 1965), American voice actor
Lorraine Lang (born 1956), Canadian curler
Lucy Robins Lang (1884–1962), American labor activist
Margie Lang (1924–2007), All-American Girls Professional Baseball League player
Martin Lang (born 1949), American Olympic fencer
Michael Lang (musician) (1941–2022), American pianist and composer
Michelle Lang (1975–2009), Canadian journalist
Otto Lang (born 1932), Canadian politician
Pearl Lang (1921–2009), American dancer and choreographer
Perry Lang (born 1959), American director, writer, and actor
Rick Lang (born 1953), Canadian curler
Robert J. Lang (born 1961), American origami artist and theorist
Sonja Lang (born 1978), Canadian linguist and inventor of Toki Pona
Stephen Lang (born 1952), American film and theater actor
Steve Lang (1949–2017), Canadian rock bassist
Violet Ranney Lang (1924–1956), American poet and playwright
Will Lang Jr. (1914–1968), American journalist 
W. Patrick Lang (born 1940), United States Army officer

Given name
Lang Hancock (1909–1992), Australian iron ore magnate
Dao Lang, Chinese musician
Shi Lang (1621–1696), Chinese admiral

Fictional characters
Adam Lang, a character in Robert Harris's novel The Ghost and its film adaptation.
Cassandra Lang, Marvel Comics superheroine daughter of Scott Lang; member of the Young Avengers
Charlie Lang, character in the film It Could Happen to You (1994 film)
Clubber Lang, antagonist in the movie Rocky III
Lana Lang from Superman stories
Scott Lang, Marvel Comics superhero known as Ant-Man who was a member of the Avengers
Shi-Long Lang, a character from Ace Attorney Investigations: Miles Edgeworth
Sophie Lang, character in the films The Notorious Sophie Lang (1934), The Return of Sophie Lang (1936), and Sophie Lang Goes West (1937)
Steven Lang (comics), Marvel Comics supervillain
Penelope and Charles "Chaz" Lang, characters on TV show Atomic Betty

See also 
 Lange (surname)
 Langer
 Long (surname) (English form)
 Laing (surname)
 Liang, surname

References

Germanic-language surnames
Danish-language surnames
Dutch-language surnames
German-language surnames
Jewish surnames
Surnames of Scottish origin
English-language surnames
Surnames from nicknames
cs:Lang
fr:Lang
ja:ラング (曖昧さ回避)
sv:Lang (olika betydelser)